= Star Showbiz =

Tabloid in Bangladesh

- Editor: Rafi Hossain
- Categories: Media and Entertainment
- Frequency: Weekly
- Company: The Daily Star (owned by Mediastar)
- Country: Bangladesh
- Language: English
- Website: thedailystar.net/showbiz

Star Showbiz is a weekly tabloid from The Daily Star in Bangladesh. Focusing on local and international media, the tabloid is published every Saturday. With the slogan "Your Weekly Dose of Entertainment", Star Showbiz maintains a clear goal to promote Bangladeshi media to the elite society of the country.
